A Montrealer is someone or something from Montreal, Quebec, Canada.

Montrealer may also refer to:

Montrealer (train), a former Amtrak train that ran from 1972 to 1995
Montrealers' Party, or Parti des Montréalais, a political party in Montreal from 1993 to 1995

See also
Montreal (disambiguation)